The Near Room is a 1995 British film directed by and starring David Hayman. It premiered on the Edinburgh International Film Festival, before its distribution in the United Kingdom in 1997. The film is set as a "Glasgow Noir", playing within the drama and thriller genres. The title of the film is a reference to where one's most nightmarish fears and dreadful imaginagitions lie. It marked James McAvoy's film debut.

Plot
Journalist Charlie Colquhoun spends his career in a rumble, with danger of a lawsuit by lawyer Harris Hill, Colquhoun's old schoolmate, while defending a client. Elise Gray, Coulquhoun's ex-wife, passes onto Charlie the job of finding a missing teenager, Tommy. In a fate of events, his life gets mangled with dodgy characters, in the underground world with murder, blackmail, child prostitution and rape.

Cast 
 Adrian Dunbar as Charlie Colquhoun
 David O'Hara as Harris Hill
 David Hayman as Dougie Patterson
 Julie Graham as Elise Gray
 Andy Serkis as Bunny
 James McAvoy as Kevin
 Robert Pugh as Eddie Harte
 Garry Sweeney as Young Harris Hill
 Allan Sharpe as Pa Savage
 Annie Louise Ross as Ma Savage
 Peter McDougall as Alastair Clegg
 James Ellis as Pat
 Emma Faulkner as Tommy Stirling

Critical response 
The response to this movie was mixed.

Derek Elley, Variety, says:

References

External links
 IMDB title 
 You have been watching "The Near Room" (Review) - Dear Scotland Blog

1990s English-language films